The 1936 Chicago Maroons football team was an American football team that represented the University of Chicago during the 1936 college football season. In their fourth season under head coach Clark Shaughnessy, the Maroons compiled a 2–5–1 record, finished in seventh place in the Big Ten Conference, and were outscored by their opponents by a combined total of 166 to 68.

Schedule

References

Chicago
Chicago Maroons football seasons
Chicago Maroons football